Joseph II Johann 6th Prince of Schwarzenberg (Vienna, June 27, 1769 - Frauenberg, December 19, 1833) was a German-Bohemian nobleman from the Schwarzenberg family.

Biography 
Joseph was born as the first son of Johann I, Prince of Schwarzenberg and Countess Maria Eleonora von Öttingen-Wallerstein and succeeded his father in 1789. He was active in the banking sector.

In 1798 he bought the Stubenbach and Gutwasser estates with the attached domains of Stachau, Altstadln and Neustadln. In 1801 or 1803 he acquired Willmendingen Castle in Klettgau, and in 1810 the Libějovice property.

In 1802 he ceded to his younger brother Karl Philipp, who later became Field Marshal, the second majorate of the Princely House and part of the family property, including Orlík Castle.

In 1806, after the occupation by the French, he lost sovereignty over the Franconian and Swabian possessions of his House.
In 1808 Joseph was accepted into the Order of the Golden Fleece.
His wife Pauline died in 1810 in a fire during a ball in the garden of the Austrian embassy in Paris in honor of Napoleon's marriage to Marie-Louise of Austria.

Marriage and offspring 
Joseph married in May 1794 Pauline Karolina Iris Princess von Arenberg-Aarschot (September 2, 1774 - July 2, 1810), daughter of Louis Engelbert, 6th Duke of Arenberg, and had six daughters and three sons:

 Marie Eleonore (1795–1848), married 1817 Alfred I, Prince of Windisch-Grätz (1787–1862)
 Marie Pauline (1798–1821), married 1817 Heinrich Eduard 2nd Prince of Schönburg-Hartenstein (1787–1872)
 Johann Adolph Joseph (1799–1888), married 1830 Eleonore Princess of Liechtenstein (1812–1873), 7th Prince of Schwarzenberg.
 Felix Ludwig (1800–1852), Prime Minister of Austria
 Aloysia Eleonore (1803–1884), married Heinrich Eduard Prince of Schönburg-Waldenburg-Hartenstein, the widower of her sister Marie Pauline.  
 Mathilde Therese (? - 1804)
 Maria Karolina (1806–1875), married 1831 Ferdinand, 2nd Prince of Bretzenheim (1801–1855)
 Anna Bertha (? - 1807), married Prince August Longin Lobkowitz (1797–1842)
 Friedrich Johann (1809–1885), 1835 Archbishop of Salzburg, Cardinal and Prince Archbishop of Prague.

Sources 
 BLKÖ:Schwarzenberg, Joseph Johann Nepomuk Fürst

1769 births
1833 deaths
18th-century Austrian people
19th-century Austrian people
Joseph II
Bohemian nobility
German Bohemian people
Knights of the Golden Fleece of Austria